Meterana coeleno is a species of moth in the family Noctuidae. This species is endemic to New Zealand.

References

Noctuinae
Moths of New Zealand
Endemic fauna of New Zealand
Moths described in 1898
Taxa named by George Hudson
Endemic moths of New Zealand